Neethi may refer to:
 Neethi (1971 film)
 Neethi (1972 film)